Everything You Always Wanted to Know About Sex* (*But Were Afraid to Ask) is a 1972 American sex comedy anthology film directed by Woody Allen. It consists of a series of short sequences loosely inspired by David Reuben's 1969 book of the same name.

The film was an early success for Woody Allen, grossing over $18 million in North America alone against a $2 million budget, making it the 10th highest-grossing film of 1972.

Film structure
The credits at the start and close of the film are played over a backdrop of a large mass of white rabbits, to the tune of "Let's Misbehave" by Cole Porter.

The film consists of seven vignettes, as follows:
 Do Aphrodisiacs Work?A court jester gives a love potion to the Queen but is foiled by her chastity belt. There are references to Shakespeare's Hamlet throughout.
 What Is Sodomy?Dr. Ross falls in love with the partner of an Armenian patient, a sheep.
 Why Do Some Women Have Trouble Reaching an Orgasm?Allen's homage to Italian film-making in general and Casanova 70, Michelangelo Antonioni, and Federico Fellini in particular, about Gina, a woman who can only reach orgasm in public.
 Are Transvestites Homosexuals?Sam Musgrave, a middle-aged married man, experiments with women's clothes.
 What Are Sex Perverts?A parody of the television game show What's My Line? called What's My Perversion?, filmed in B&W kinescope-style and hosted by Jack Barry.  The four panelists who attempt to guess the contestant's perversion are Regis Philbin, Robert Q. Lewis, Pamela Mason, and Toni Holt.  After they fail to guess that the contestant's perversion is "Likes to expose himself on subways," a second segment of the show is presented, in which a selected viewer (in this case a rabbi) gets to act out his bondage and humiliation fantasy while his wife eats pork.
 Are the Findings of Doctors and Clinics Who Do Sexual Research and Experiments Accurate?Victor, a sex researcher, and Helen Lacey, a journalist, visit a Dr. Bernardo, a researcher who formerly worked with Masters and Johnson but now has his own laboratory complete with a lab assistant named Igor.  After they see a series of bizarre sexual experiments underway at the lab and realize that Bernardo is insane, they escape before Helen becomes the subject of another of his experiments.  The segment culminates with a scene in which the countryside is terrorized by a giant runaway breast created by the researcher.  The first part of this segment is a parody of Ed Wood's Bride of the Monster (1955), and especially, The Unearthly (1957), which also stars John Carradine. The second part parodies many of the "Giant" monster movies of the nineteen fifties.
 What Happens During Ejaculation?The NASA-like mission control center in a man's brain is seen, as he gets involved in a sexual clinch with an NYU graduate (knowledge that she is a graduate of NYU assures coital success). As he achieves orgasm, the soldier-like, white-uniformed sperm are dispatched paratrooper-style into the great unknown.

Cast

 Woody Allen as Victor / Fabrizio / The Fool / Sperm
 John Carradine as Dr. Bernardo
 Lou Jacobi as Sam Musgrave
 Louise Lasser as Gina
 Anthony Quayle as The King
 Tony Randall as The Operator
 Lynn Redgrave as The Queen
 Burt Reynolds as Sperm Switchboard Chief
 Gene Wilder as Dr. Ross
 Jack Barry as Himself
 Elaine Giftos as Mrs. Ross
 Toni Holt as Herself
 Robert Q. Lewis as Himself
 Heather MacRae as Helen Lacey
 Pamela Mason as Herself
 Sidney Miller as George
 Regis Philbin as Himself
 Titos Vandis as Stavros Milos
 Stanley Adams as Stomach Operator
 Oscar Beregi as Brain Control
 Alan Caillou The Fool's Father
 Don Chuy as Football Player
 Dort Clark as Sheriff
 Erin Fleming as The Girl
 Geoffrey Holder as Sorcerer
 Baruch Lumet as The Rabbi
 Tom Mack as Football Player
 Jay Robinson as The Priest
 Ref Sanchez as Igor
 Robert Walden as Sperm
 H.E. West as Bernard Jaffe
 Norman Alden as Switchboard

Soundtrack
 "Let's Misbehave" (1927) - Music and Lyrics by Cole Porter - Played by Irving Aaronson and his Commanders
 "Battle Hymn of the Republic" (circa 1856) - Music by William Steffe - Lyrics by Julia Ward Howe
 "Red River Valley" (1896) - Music by James Kerrigen - Played on harmonica by Woody Allen

Critical response
The film holds an 89% "Fresh" rating of on the review aggregation website Rotten Tomatoes, based on 19 reviews.

An August 1972 review by Time said that many of the film's ideas "sound good on paper" but that the "skits wind down rather than take off from the ideas"; the film includes "some broad, funny send-ups of other movies (Fantastic Voyage, La notte), and its fair share of memorably wacky lines" but that "overall it is just Woody marking time and being merely a little funnier".

The Time Out Film Guide noted that some of the film's sketches are "dross, but the parodies of Antonioni (all angst and alienation of a wife who can achieve orgasm only in public places) and of TV panel games ('What's My Perversion?') are brilliantly accurate and very funny. Best of all is the sci-fi parody entitled What Happens During Ejaculation?"

In 2004, Christopher Null, founder of filmcritic.com, called it a "minor classic and Woody Allen's most absurd film ever".

Censorship
The film was banned in Ireland on March 20, 1973. A cut version was passed in 1979 and released theatrically in 1980, removing both a bestiality reference ("the greatest lay I ever had", referring to a sheep) and a man having sex with a loaf of rye bread. The ban on the uncut version was eventually lifted.

See also
 List of American films of 1972

References

External links

 

1970s sex comedy films
1972 films
American anthology films
American sex comedy films
1970s English-language films
Films based on non-fiction books
Films directed by Woody Allen
Films produced by Charles H. Joffe
Films shot in Los Angeles
Films with screenplays by Woody Allen
United Artists films
1972 comedy films
Sketch comedy films
1970s American films